Saltation may refer to:

 Saltation (biology), an evolutionary hypothesis emphasizing sudden and drastic change
 Saltation (geology), a process of particle transport by fluids
 Cutaneous rabbit illusion (sensory saltation), a perceptual illusion evoked by a rapid sequence of sensory stimuli
 Saltation (software engineering), the antithesis of continuous integration
 Saltation (novel), a novel set in Sharon Lee and Steve Miller's Liaden universe

See also 
 Saltatory conduction, a process by which nerve impulses are transmitted along axons